A linebacker is a position in American and Canadian football.

Linebacker may also refer to:
Operation Linebacker, a U.S. military campaign conducted against North Vietnam
Operation Linebacker II, a U.S. military campaign conducted against North Vietnam
Operation Phantom Linebacker, a coalition military operation in Iraq 
M6 Linebacker, a fighting vehicle